Upala is a canton in the Alajuela province of Costa Rica. The head city is in Upala district.

History 
Upala was created on 17 March 1970 by decree 4541.

Geography 
Upala has an area of  km² and a mean elevation of  metres.

Upala Canton is bordered by Nicaragua on the north, the Las Haciendas River on the northwest, Rito River on the southeast, and the Cordillera de Guanacaste on the south. The Rincón de la Vieja, Santa María, Miravalles and Tenorio volcanoes are landmarks along the southern border.

Districts 
The canton of Upala is subdivided into the following districts:
 Upala
 Aguas Claras
 San José
 Bijagua
 Delicias
 Dos Ríos
 Yolillal
 Canalete

Demographics 

For the 2011 census, Upala had a population of  inhabitants.

Transportation

Road transportation 
The canton is covered by the following road routes:

References 

Cantons of Alajuela Province
Populated places in Alajuela Province